Walter Griffith (9 January 1915 – 6 July 1983) was a Guyanese cricketer. He played in six first-class matches for British Guiana from 1938 to 1948.

See also
 List of Guyanese representative cricketers

References

External links
 

1915 births
1983 deaths
Guyanese cricketers
Guyana cricketers